Alyssa Kathleen Hayden (born 7 June 1970) is an Australian politician.

Born in Perth, Hayden was a proprietor of a small business and a Senate staff member before entering politics. In 2008, she was elected to the Western Australian Legislative Council as a Liberal Party member, representing East Metropolitan Region. Her term began on 22 May 2009. She was defeated at the 2017 state election.

In May 2018, Hayden was preselected as the Liberal candidate in the Darling Range by-election, held on 23 June, and regained the seat for the Liberals. She failed to retain the seat at the 2021 election.

After the 2021 election, Hayden started working in real estate sales.

References

1970 births
Living people
Liberal Party of Australia members of the Parliament of Western Australia
Members of the Western Australian Legislative Council
21st-century Australian politicians
21st-century Australian women politicians
Women members of the Western Australian Legislative Council
Women members of the Western Australian Legislative Assembly
Members of the Western Australian Legislative Assembly